The  is a Rapid train service in Japan operated by Central Japan Railway Company (JR Central), which runs from  to  and . The service passes through several significant locations en route, such as Tsu, the capital city of Mie Prefecture.

History
The service was introduced on 10 March 1990, as a way to compete with Kintetsu Railway and to provide a cheap, quick and efficient route from Nagoya to the Ise Peninsula. The Mie is faster than a Kintetsu express train but slower than a Kintetsu limited express train. Kintetsu still maintains superior numbers of passengers to this day.

Route
The train stops at the following stations:

 -  -  -  - - -  -  -  - - - - -  - -  - - 

Nakaseko is only served by a few Nagoya-bound services. Suzuka Circuit Inō is only served on days of racing events at the nearby Suzuka Circuit. Other stations in brackets are not served by all trains.

Between Yokkaichi and Tsu, the train runs along the private Ise Railway Ise Line. An additional fee is required to ride the train in this section. Therefore, this service is not fully valid for Japan Rail pass holders.

Service
There are 13 daily departures in each direction, approximately one train an hour in each direction for most of the day. Services that run after the 17:37 departure from Nagoya terminate at Iseshi and do not continue to Toba. On weekends and holidays, there is an extra service departing Nagoya station at 7:43 in the morning for Iseshi. The Mie is serviced by KiHa 75 series DMUs, usually in 2 or 4 car formations. 6 cars may occasionally be used in busy seasons and on days of special events, such as a race at the Suzuka Circuit.

Facilities
Only standard class is available on this service. There is no Green car seating. Seat reservations can be made for an extra fee. There are one or more universal access toilets depending on how many carriages are being used. There are also wheelchair spaces. No catering facilities are available on this train.

References

Central Japan Railway Company
Named passenger trains of Japan
Railway services introduced in 1990
1990 establishments in Japan